The 2006 Western Michigan Broncos football team represented Western Michigan University (WMU) in the 2006 NCAA Division I FBS football season. They finished the season with an 8–5 overall record and a 6–2 record in the Mid-American Conference (MAC). The Broncos' 6–2 record gave them a second place in the MAC West Division. The team was invited to play in the 2007 International Bowl in Toronto, Ontario, Canada and lost to the Cincinnati Bearcats 27–24. The bowl game was WMU's first bowl game since the 1988 California Bowl.

The team was coached by Bill Cubit and played their homes game in Waldo Stadium in Kalamazoo, Michigan.

Schedule

References

Western Michigan
Western Michigan Broncos football seasons
Western Michigan Broncos football